Fyodorovka is a rural locality (a selo) in Kupriyanovsky Selsoviet of Zavitinsky District, Amur Oblast, Russia. The population was 26 as of 2018. There are 3 streets.

Geography 
Fyodorovka is located 27 km southwest of Zavitinsk (the district's administrative centre) by road. Kupriyanovka is the nearest rural locality.

References 

Rural localities in Zavitinsky District